Sue Terry (born 1959) is a jazz saxophonist and composer.

While a student at the Hartt School in Hartford, Connecticut, Terry was a protégé of saxophonist Jackie McLean. McLean encouraged her to move to New York City, where she was later mentored by Clifford Jordan, Junior Cook and Barry Harris. They gave her the nickname "Sweet Sue". She now uses the spelling "Su Terry."

After moving to New York City in 1982, Terry became a featured soloist with bands led by Charlie Persip, Clifford Jordan, Walter Bishop Jr., and Jaki Byard. She worked with George Duke, Dr. John, Barry Harris, Al Jarreau, Chaka Khan, Mike Longo, Irene Reid, Hilton Ruiz, Billy Taylor, Clark Terry, Teri Thornton, and Howard Johnson.

She is the author of Inside the Mind of a Musician, For The Curious, and I Was a Jazz Musician for the FBI. /> She wrote the instruction books  Practice Like the Pros, Step One: Play Alto Sax, Step One: Play Tenor Sax, and Step One: Play Clarinet.

Discography
As Leader/Composer:
   SU TERRY “GREATEST HITS”  Qi Note Records QN 9777
 SWEET SUE TERRY "LIVE AT THE DEER HEAD INN" Deer Head Records 2015
 SWEET SUE TERRY "GILLY’S CAPER" Qi Note Records QN 8736  
 SWEET SUE TERRY "PINK SLIMY WORM" Qi Note Records QN 8726
 SWEET SUE TERRY “BANDLEADER 101” (digital release) Qi Note Records QN 8767
As Co-Leader/Composer:  
 PEGGY STERN & SWEET SUE TERRY “THE ART OF THE DUO”  Estrella Music EM730
 TIM PRICE & SWEET SUE TERRY "THE BLUE.SEUM PROJECT" Qi Note Records QN 8746  
As Soloist: 
 SCOT ALBERTSON “VIBINATION” 
 SCOT ALBERTSON “WITH EVERY NOTE, A STEP” 
 SCOT ALBERTSON “FATE REVEALED BY DESIGN”  PAUL AMMENDOLA "LET THE WIND DANCE" Sebastian Records 327001
 BAD ASS FREAKS “NEIGHBORS” Allzeit Music  
 JAKI BYARD  "PHANTASIES I" Soul Note 121 175-1  
 CUBANO "L’ESSENCE CUBANO" Mini Records 1153  
 DEBBIE DE COUDREAUX "HAVE A LITTLE PARIS ON ME" DLL Productions  
 DIVA "SOMETHING’S COMING" Perfect Sound 1216  
 EXODUS "VICTOIRE" Sunshine Records 8034  
 EXODUS "LE ZOUK" Disques Esperance 17901  
 YA YA FORNIER w/ DAVID MURRAY "BEARCAT" Random Chance RCD-9  
 RICARDO FRANCK (TI PLUME) "MELI MELO" DiskHaiti CDDH 30003  
 FRED HO "NIGHT VISION" Autonomedia (Book/CD)  
 DERWYN HOLDER ENSEMBLE "TIME BEING" Neen Records N103  
 CLIFFORD JORDAN "DOWN THROUGH THE YEARS" Milestone 9197-2
   TULLY McGREGOR "MOURNING DOVE" Erixna Records ER4779
 JOE McMAHON, JR. "SECONDHAND HEART FOR SALE" Sharla Records SHACD-1916
   JOE McMAHON, JR. "YOU’RE SOMETHING TO LIVE FOR" Sharla Records SHACD-1917  
 MINI ALL STARS "CHANGE LE BEAT" Mini Records 1166
 MINI ALL STARS "CHANGE ENCORE LE BEAT" Mini Records S119  
 MINI ALL STARS "PIROULI" Mini Records 1169  
 CHARLI PERSIP & SUPERBAND "NO DUMMIES ALLOWED" Soul Note 121 179-2  
 JEFF RAHEB "TOPAZ UNDER MOON" TPZ 1001
 HILTON RUIZ “HILTON’S LAST NOTE”  HILTON RUIZ MUSIC 112280
 HILTON RUIZ “GOIN’ BACK TO NEW ORLEANS” M27 EP
 PEGGY STERN “Z OCTET” Estrella Music
  MICHAEL JEFRY STEVENS  “SONGBOOK”  MJS Productions
 TI MANNO "BAMBOCHE CREOLE" Chancy Records 8029
 JACK WOODBRIDGE “PICTURE THIS” 
 JACK WOODBRIDGE “JACK OF HEARTS”
As Composer:  
 JOHN MASTROIANNI / SHERRIE MARICLE  "THE TIME BEING" Jazz Alliance 10019
   BOBBY SANABRIA AFRO CUBAN JAZZ DREAM BIG BAND  "LIVE AND IN CLAVE" Arabesque AJ0149 *Grammy nominated*
Compilations:
 SWEET SUE TERRY “GREATEST HITS” Qi Note Records QN 9777
   VARIOUS ARTISTS  "SAX IN THE CITY"  Apria Records 072524  
 VARIOUS ARTISTS "JAZZ IN THE WILDE" Uh Oh 0005
 MINI ALL STARS "GREATEST HITS" MSRD 1001  MINI ALL STARS "GREATEST HITS Vol. II" MSRD 1007  
 MINI All STARS "S.O.S." MSRD 1228  
Instructional CDs:  
 SUE TERRY "PRACTICE LIKE THE PROS" Music Sales Corp.   
 SUE TERRY "STEP ONE: PLAY ALTO SAXOPHONE" Music Sales Corp.   
 SUE TERRY "STEP ONE: PLAY TENOR SAXOPHONE" Music Sales Corp. 
  SUE TERRY "STEP ONE: PLAY CLARINET" Music Sales Corp.

References

 Reed All About It  by Bob Bernotas
 Madame Jazz by Leslie Gourse
 Experiencing Jazz by Michael Stephans

External links
Official website

1959 births
Living people
University of Hartford Hartt School alumni
21st-century American saxophonists
American women jazz musicians
American jazz saxophonists
Women jazz saxophonists
21st-century American women musicians
Women jazz composers